Farlington is an unincorporated community in Crawford County, Kansas, United States. As of the 2020 census, the population of the community and nearby areas was 68.

History
The first post office in Farlington was established in July 1870.

Farlington was a shipping point on the St. Louis–San Francisco Railway, and was laid out in 1869 when that line was extended to it.

Farlington has a post office with ZIP code 66734.

Demographics

For statistical purposes, the United States Census Bureau has defined Farlington as a census-designated place (CDP).

References

Further reading

External links
 Crawford County maps: Current, Historic, KDOT

Unincorporated communities in Crawford County, Kansas
Unincorporated communities in Kansas